"Pick Up the Pieces" is a 1974 song by the Average White Band from their second album, AWB. On the single, songwriting credit was given to founding member and saxophonist Roger Ball and guitarist Hamish Stuart individually and the entire band collectively. It is essentially an instrumental, apart from the song's title being shouted at several points in the song.

Background
The guitar line of the song came from Hamish Stuart, while Roger Ball wrote the first part of the horn melody. The song was produced by Arif Mardin. According to Malcolm 'Molly' Duncan, he had disagreed with releasing the song as a single because the song is a "funk instrumental played by Scotsmen with no lyrics other than a shout". He also said about the shouts of "Pick up the pieces": "It's about picking yourself up when things aren't going well. We'd spent a lot of time making no money whatsoever, so it felt very relevant."

The song was included as an extended long version on the live Person To Person album (1976) (18:06) and on the various artists album The Atlantic Family Live at Montreux (1977) (21:40). The tenor saxophone solo on the Montreux version is by Michael Brecker. The solo on the original release is by Molly Duncan.

The song is in the key of F minor.

Chart performance
"Pick Up the Pieces" was released in the United Kingdom in July 1974 but failed to chart. When the album was released in the United States in October 1974, radio stations there started to play the song, and on 22 February 1975, it went to the top of the US singles chart and peaked at number five on the soul charts. Billboard ranked it as the No. 20 song for 1975. In Canada, it reached number 4 on the weekly charts, and number 44 on the year-end chart. After its North American success, the song charted in the UK and climbed to number six. "Pick Up the Pieces" also made it to number eleven on the US disco chart.

References

External links
 Entry at discogs.com

1974 singles
1970s instrumentals
Funk songs
Disco songs
Billboard Hot 100 number-one singles
Cashbox number-one singles
Song recordings produced by Arif Mardin
Atlantic Records singles
1974 songs
Songs written by Hamish Stuart
Average White Band songs